A trade preference is a preference by one country for buying goods from some other country more than from other countries. It grants special support to one country over another. It is the opposite of a trade prohibition.

For example, the Agreement on the withdrawal of the United Kingdom of Great Britain and Northern Ireland from the European Union and the European Atomic Energy Community (Brexit withdrawal agreement) stated that 

In the UK, the Trades Union Congress (TUC) has stated that the country's trade preference system "should provide Global South countries
with unilateral tariff-free access to the UK’s market on the condition of respect for fundamental ILO standards and progress towards the realisation of the UN Sustainable Development Goals, in particular Goal 8 on Decent work.

A preferential certificate of origin is a document attesting that goods in a particular shipment are of a certain origin under the definitions of a particular bilateral or multilateral trading agreement.

See also
EUR.1 movement certificate
Rules of origin
Trade mandate
Trade prohibition
Trade sanctions
National treatment
Most favored nation

References

Commercial policy